Jack Alexander Finlay (September 8, 1921 – March 6, 2014) was a professional American football player who played guard for five seasons for the Los Angeles Rams. He was born in Los Angeles.

References

1921 births
2014 deaths
Players of American football from Los Angeles
American football offensive guards
UCLA Bruins football players
Los Angeles Rams players